The Australia national under-20 soccer team, known colloquially as the Young Socceroos, represents Australia in international under-20 soccer. The team is controlled by the governing body for soccer in Australia, Football Australia (FA), which is currently a member of the Asian Football Confederation (AFC) and the regional ASEAN Football Federation (AFF) since leaving the Oceania Football Confederation (OFC) in 2006. The team's official nickname is the Young Socceroos.

Australia is a twelve-time OFC champion and five-time AFF champion. The team has represented Australia at the FIFA U-20 World Cup tournaments on fifteen occasions with their best result being a fourth-place finish in 1991 and 1993.

History

2006 AFC U-19 Championship
In their first foray into Asia in 2006 the team lost the quarterfinals of the AFC Youth Championship, to South Korea, despite being considered one of the stronger teams. This was the first time the Young Socceroos had failed to qualify for the FIFA U-20 World Cup since 1989. Subsequently, on 5 February 2007 the FFA decided not to renew Ange Postecoglou's contract as head coach, he was replaced by former Socceroo, and current AIS head coach of soccer, Steve O'Connor.

2008 AFC U-19 Championship
On 24 June 2008 Jan Versleijen was appointed as the new U-20 coach ahead of the 2008 tournament, with the FFA eager to avoid a repeat of 2006, and qualify for the 2009 FIFA U-20 World Cup in Egypt. In preparation for the tournament, Australia competed in the 2008 ASEAN Youth Championships in Thailand alongside China, Korea Republic and Thailand. A competition they ultimately won through a penalty shoot-out against South Korea. The 2008 AFC U-19 Championship was hosted by Saudi Arabia. Australia topped Group D with wins over Thailand and Jordan and a 1–1 draw with Uzbekistan. Australia then needed an extra time winner from Mitch Nichols to overcome North Korea in the quarter final before losing 3–0 to UAE in the semi-final. However, making it through to the semi-final was enough to qualify for the 2009 FIFA U-20 World Cup.

2009 FIFA U-20 World Cup
Australia qualified for the 2009 FIFA U-20 World Cup in Egypt after finishing in the final four of the 2008 AFC U-19 Championship. Despite a late James Holland penalty, Australia lost their opening game to Czech Republic 2–1 before Costa Rica defeated the 'Young Socceroos' 3–0. In the final group game against Brazil, Aaron Mooy gave Australia an early lead however the final result saw Brazil win 3–1 and Australia was eliminated without a point.

2010 AFC U-19 Championship
To qualify for the tournament, Australia travelled to Bandung, Indonesia in November 2009 for the qualification group and proceeded after finishing second in a group of six nations. Wins over Hong Kong, Chinese Taipei and Singapore proceeded a 0–0 draw with the hosts, Indonesia and a loss to Japan.

Australia competed in the 2010 AFC Under 19 Championship Finals held in Zibo, China.

The tournament was held from 3 to 17 October 2010 in Shandong province. The matches were played at the Zibo Sports Complex Stadium and Linzi Stadium.

Wins over Yemen and Iran followed by a 0–0 draw with South Korea meant Australia topped the group on goal difference. In the quarter final against United Arab Emirates, Australia twice led before UAE equalised and took the game to extra time. Two extra time goals for Australia set up a semi-final with Saudi Arabia, which Australia won 2–0 thanks to a Kerem Bulut double. The final was played on 17 October 2010 against North Korea. Despite leading in the first half, Australia couldn't hold on and lost the final 3–2. Kerem Bulut was the tournament's top scorer with 7 goals. Australia qualified for the 2011 FIFA U-20 World Cup to be held in Colombia.

2011 FIFA U-20 World Cup
Australia qualified for the 2011 FIFA U-20 World Cup in Colombia after finishing in the final four of the 2010 AFC U-19 Championship. Australia were drawn in a group comprising Spain, Ecuador & Costa Rica.

Australia failed to progress out of the group after finishing last with one point. The first fixture resulted in a one all draw with Ecuador after Tommy Oar scored a late equaliser. The next game saw Costa Rica defeat Australia 3–2. In the final game against Spain, Australia was down by four goals after just 18 minutes. In the 27th minute Kerem Bulut grabbed a goal back before Spain made it 5–1 with a 31st-minute penalty. This was to be the final score.

2012 AFC U-19 Championship
To participate in the 2012 AFC U-19 Championship the Young Socceroos first had to qualify. The confederation was geographically separated and Australia was grouped with other East Asian nations, China, Indonesia, Singapore and Macau. These five nations met in Malaysia in November 2011 and Australia proceeded through the group by winning all four games, scoring 20 goals and conceding just 1.

The 2012 AFC U-19 Championship was hosted by United Arab Emirates in November. Australia were seeded for the tournament along with the hosts and South Korea and North Korea. Australia's opening game was against Qatar. The only goal of the game came in the 11th minute for Australia when Corey Gameiro scored. Gameiro was on the scoresheet in both of the following group games when his 81st-minute equaliser against Syria and his 91st-minute equaliser against Saudi Arabia meant both games finished 1–1. The critical late goal to Saudi Arabia meant Australia not only proceeded on to the next stage at the expense of the Saudis, but also topped the group.

Australia took on Jordan in the quarter final and it was Gameiro scoring all three goals in a 3–0 win that put Australia through to the semi final and secured qualification to the 2013 FIFA U-20 World Cup in Turkey. Two second half goals to Iraq meant Australia were eliminated from the tournament. Gameiro's six goals was one short of the top goalscorer award.

2013 FIFA U-20 World Cup
Paul Okon coached Australia in the 2013 FIFA U-20 World Cup in Turkey where they failed to win a game despite scoring the first goal in all 3 fixtures. Daniel De Silva gave Australia the lead before Colombia levelled the game at 1–1. Joshua Brillante scored early prior to El Salvador scoring twice before halftime and Jamie Maclaren scored in the 52nd minute but again Australia couldn't hold on with the hosts, Turkey scoring twice. These results mean Australia has failed to win in any of their last 13 U-20 World Cup fixtures with the last victory coming over Brazil on 4 December 2003.

2014 AFC U-19 Championship
Australia started the 2014 AFC U-19 Championship campaign by participating in the qualifiers in October 2013. They travelled to Malaysia where they were joined by Vietnam, Hong Kong and Chinese Taipei. Mongolia had withdrawn. The first game was an easy 7–0 win over Hong Kong. Peter Skapetis scored four goals. They then defeated Chinese Taipei 3–0 before a humiliating 5–1 loss to Vietnam. Despite this, Australia were to proceed to the finals tournament as one of the best second placed teams.

The 2014 AFC U-19 Championship was hosted by Myanmar in October 2014. Paul Okon again was head coach of the Young Socceroos for the tournament. The opening game was against United Arab Emirates. Brandon Borrello gave Australia a late lead but an 85th-minute penalty to the UAE saw the score end in a draw. The second match was a 1–0 win over Indonesia through a Jaushua Sotirio goal. The final group game had Australia leading Uzbekistan in the 66th minute thanks to Stefan Mauk. However an 82nd-minute equaliser would prove devastating for Australia as this, and the result in the concurrent game placed UAE, Uzbekistan and Australia all on five points with Australia having the inferior goal difference and hence elimination from the tournament. Many observers sighted Australia's lack of desire to score more goals against Indonesia as the contributing factor to the elimination. Australia failed to qualify for the New Zealand 2015 FIFA U-20 World Cup. This is just the second time since 1989 that Australia hasn't competed in the biennial event.

2016 AFC U-19 Championship
Australia qualified for the 2016 AFC U-19 Championship that was held in Bahrain during October 2016. In the qualifiers hosted by Laos, they finished runner-up in their group and progressed on goal difference as one of the five best second placed teams. Comfortable wins over Philippines and Laos were followed by a heavy 3–0 loss to Japan. Steve Kuzmanovski finished as Australia's top scorer with three goals. This was the sixth consecutive U-19 Championship that Australia qualified for.

Australia were coached by Ufuk Talay for the tournament and were drawn into Group D. The opening fixture was a 1–0 victory against China through a goal to Mario Shabow. The second game was against Uzbekistan. The Uzbeks led by three until they suffered a send off. Australia then responded through two second half penalties to Liam Youlley and George Blackwood however the final result was a 3–2 win for Uzbekistan. Australian needed to win against Tajikistan in the final group game to progress. Anthony Kalik had an early penalty saved and was later sent off for two yellow cards. The game finished 0–0 and Australia were eliminated from the tournament. As a consequence, they also failed to qualify for the 2017 FIFA U-20 World Cup. This is the first time that Australia have failed to qualify for two consecutive U-20 World Cups.

2018 AFC U-19 Championship
The 2018 AFC U-19 Championship was hosted by Indonesia in October and November. Australia commenced their qualification for the tournament in Vietnam. The matches had originally been scheduled to be played in Shepparton, Victoria however the Australian government refused entry to the North Korean squad. As a result, the matches were moved to neutral Vietnam although the costs associated with the shift in venue saw Northern Mariana Islands withdraw. This left just two opponents in the group, North Korea and Hong Kong. In Australia's first match against Hong Kong, Ramy Najjarine scored early and then a late double from Moudi Najjar gave Australia a 3–0 win. They then defeated North Korea 4–1 with goals again to Najjarine and Najjar as well as Fabian Monge and Denis Genreau.

With Ante Milicic now in charge, Australia started the tournament against South Korea in Bekasi. The Koreans scored first in the 55th minute however Najjarine curled in an 89th-minute equaliser to share the points. The second match was against Vietnam which Australia won 2–1 through goals to Angus Thurgate and Ben Folami. Reports emerged after the game that many of the Australian squad had been suffering from illness. In their last group match against Jordan, Australia needed at least a draw to advance and they finished 1–1, with Oliver Puflett scoring the goal in the 10th minute. In the quarter-final, Australia lost 3–1 to Saudi Arabia, with Nathaniel Atkinson scoring their only goal. Elimination at the quarter-final stage meant that Australia failed to qualify for the Under-20 World Cup for a record third consecutive time.

Players

Current squad
The following 23 players were called up for 2023 AFC U-20 Asian Cup  matches from 1 to 18 March 2023. 

Caps and goals correct as of the 2023 AFC U-20 Asian Cup  game against Uzbekistan on 11 March 2023.

Recent call-ups
The following players have been called up within the last 12 months and remain eligible for selection.

Recent results and fixtures

2022
At the end of August, Football Australia withdrew the team from the Asian Cup qualification tournament, citing safety reasons and travel advice. They organised to play at the Costa Cálida Supercup in Spain instead. However, they were reinstated when Iraq lost hosting rights due to the 2021–2022 Iraqi political crisis, with the matches rescheduled and relocated to Kuwait City.

2023

Records

Players with most appearances

Players in bold are still available for selection.

Players with most Goals Scored

Players in bold are still available for selection.

Competitive record

FIFA U-20 World Cup

OFC U-20 Championship

AFC U-20 Asian Cup

AFF U-19 Youth Championship

Notes

References

External links
 
Oz Football Young Socceroos Archive

Asian national under-20 association football teams
National youth sports teams of Australia